The Tall Target is a 1951 American historical crime film directed by Anthony Mann and starring Dick Powell, Paula Raymond and Adolphe Menjou. Powell stars as a police sergeant who tries to stop the assassination of Abraham Lincoln at a train stop as Lincoln travels to his inauguration. It is based on the alleged Baltimore Plot.

The film's sets were designed by the art directors Eddie Imazu and Cedric Gibbons.

Plot
New York Police Sergeant John Kennedy once guarded Abraham Lincoln for 48 hours while he was campaigning for President of the United States, and came away deeply impressed by the man. Kennedy has infiltrated a cabal and discovered that an assassination attempt will be made as the president-elect makes his way by train via Baltimore to Washington, DC. His boss, Superintendent Simon G. Stroud, dismisses the threat as "hogwash", as does Caleb Jeffers, a militia colonel with whom Stroud is meeting. Kennedy resigns on the spot to try to foil the conspirators on his own. Having already sent a copy of his report to the Secretary of War, he sends a telegram to Lincoln, urgently requesting a meeting in Baltimore.

On February 22, 1861, he boards the train bound for Washington, where Inspector Reilly is to give him his train ticket. However, Kennedy cannot find his friend. Without a ticket, he is forced to get off by conductor Homer Crowley, and there are no more tickets to be had. As the train starts off, Kennedy sprints after it and climbs aboard anyway. Among the other passengers are Mrs. Charlotte Alsop, an anti-slavery writer; Lance Beaufort, a West Point cadet who plans to resign and enlist in the Confederate army; his sister Ginny; and their slave Rachel.

After much searching, Kennedy finally discovers Reilly's body on the exterior platform of a car, but the corpse slips off the train as he is reaching for it.  When he returns to his berth, he finds an imposter claiming to be him and in possession of his ticket. Fellow passenger Jeffers vouches for Kennedy and gives him a spare ticket to share his compartment.

The imposter forces Kennedy off the train at gunpoint at the next stop, planning to kill him when the train whistle sounds. Kennedy grapples with him. The commotion attracts Jeffers' attention, and the colonel shoots and kills the conspirator. When they reboard, Jeffers offers Kennedy first use of the only bed in their compartment. While Kennedy appears to be dozing, Jeffers steals the derringer he had loaned the ex-policeman and shoots him. However, Kennedy had become suspicious (as Jeffers' first shot could have been intended for him instead of the conspirator) and had tampered with the bullet. Jeffers confesses that he is in the plot in order to protect his shares in Northern cotton mills, which would be adversely affected by war.

At the next stop in Philadelphia, Kennedy tries to have Jeffers arrested, but Jeffers obtains confirmation by telegram from Stroud that Kennedy is no longer a police officer, and it is Kennedy who is taken into custody by Lieutenant Coulter. Rachel tries to give Kennedy an urgent message, but is brushed off by Coulter. Kennedy manages to escape and get back on the train. Meanwhile, the exasperated conductor is ordered to hold the train until a special package is delivered. Passenger Mrs. Gibbons meets and takes aboard her ailing husband.

Kennedy runs into Rachel, who informs him that Beaufort is getting off at Baltimore, not Atlanta as he had claimed. Kennedy is taken prisoner by Beaufort and tied up in Jeffers' compartment. The plotters are disappointed, however, when they receive news that Lincoln has cancelled his speech in Baltimore, where Beaufort was to assassinate him.

Jeffers gets off, but as the train is pulling away, he remembers Mrs. Gibbons; he surmises her "husband" is actually Lincoln in disguise. Running after the train, he manages to alert Beaufort. Kennedy, however, frees himself and, in the ensuing struggle, sends the would-be assassin tumbling from the speeding train. Afterward, Mrs. Gibbons tells Kennedy that she is an undercover Pinkerton agent, and that his report to the War Department was read by Allan Pinkerton, who persuaded Lincoln to cancel his speech and travel incognito on the train as the ailing Mr. Gibbons. As the train reaches Washington, Lincoln muses, "Did ever any President come to his inauguration so like a thief in the night?"

Cast

Reception
According to MGM records the film earned $473,000 in the US and Canada and $147,000 elsewhere, resulting in a loss of $608,000.

References

External links
 
 
 
 

1951 films
1951 crime drama films
1950s thriller films
1950s historical films
American crime drama films
American thriller films
American black-and-white films
American historical films
1950s English-language films
Fictional depictions of Abraham Lincoln in film
Films about assassinations
Thriller films based on actual events
Films directed by Anthony Mann
Films set in 1861
Baltimore Plot
Metro-Goldwyn-Mayer films
Rail transport films
1950s American films